Bone loss may refer to a number of entities:

 Osteopenia, a condition in which overall bone density decreases without causing symptoms
 Osteoporosis, a condition in which overall bone density decreases while causing symptoms
 Periodontitis, a condition in which the supporting bone around teeth exhibits resorption